Sansoni is an Italian publisher founded in 1873 by Giulio Cesare Sansoni, located in Florence.

History 
Until the 1930s, Sansoni devoted almost all its attention to literature, with its works mostly aimed at schools and universities. Some of its most important collections are "Raccolta di opere inedite o rare di ogni secolo della letteratura italiana" (started in 1880),  "Biblioteca scolastica di classici italiani (started in 1885), "Collezione di classici greci""  (started in 1887), "Biblioteca critica della letteratura italiana" (started in 1895). In 1932 Sansoni was bought by Giovanni Gentile who extended its scope into philosophy and history. He started some new magazines including the second series of "Giornale critico della filosofia italiana", "Critica d'arte" (directed by Ranuccio Bianchi Bandinelli, Carlo Ludovico Ragghianti and Roberto Longhi), "Lingua nostra" (directed by Bruno Migliorini e Giacomo Devoto).

After the end of World War II and the execution of Gentile, the publisher was managed by his son Federico. He opened the way to encyclopedias (including Enciclopedia cattolica and Enciclopedia dello spettacolo) and dictionaries. In 1976 Federico Gentile sold the company to Rizzoli and on the same year he founded the publishing house Le Lettere (still located in Florence). Le Lettere acquired part of the titles of Sansoni, including Giovanni Gentile's Opera Omnia. Sansoni became later one of the many trademarks of Arnoldo Mondadori Editore. Sansoni's archives are in Archivio di Stato di Firenze, which is restoring and inventorying them after the flood of 1966.

Bibliography 
 Marino Parenti, G.C. Sansoni: Editore in Firenze, Landi, Firenze, 1956
 Gianfranco Pedullà, Il mercato delle idee: Giovanni Gentile e la Casa editrice Sansoni, Il Mulino, Bologna, 1986
 Testimonianze per un centenario, Sansoni, Firenze, 1974
 Sansoni, 1873-1968, Officine Grafiche Firenze, Firenze, 1968 (exhibition organized by Comitato della Loggia Rucellai)

Other projects 
  Wikimedia Commons has pictures and other files about Sansoni

External links 

 
 
 Giannetto Avanzi, Sansoni, in Enciclopedia Italiana (1936)
 Sansoni, in Treccani online

Publishing companies of Italy
Companies established in 1873